Gleason may refer to:

Places in the United States
 Gleason, Tennessee, a town
 Gleason, West Virginia, an unincorporated community
 Gleason, Wisconsin, an unincorporated community

Films
 Gleason (2002 film), a television film starring Brad Garrett as Jackie Gleason
 Gleason (2016 film), a documentary about football player Steve Gleason

People and fictional characters
 Gleason (surname), a list of people and a fictional character
 Gleason (given name), a list of people

Other uses
 Gleason Corporation, a machine-tool builder based in Rochester, New York, United States
 Gleason score, medical test used in the prognosis of prostate cancer
 10639 Gleason, an asteroid

See also
 Gleason's theorem, mathematical result of particular importance for quantum logic
 Gleason grading system, used in evaluating the prognosis of men with prostate cancer
 Lev Gleason Publications, New York-based publisher of comic books in the 1940s and early 1950s
 Jackie Gleason Bus Depot, Brooklyn, New York
 Gleason Building (disambiguation)
 Gleason House (disambiguation)
 Gleeson (disambiguation)
 Gleison (disambiguation)